Sixth Form Government is a government secondary school offering advanced level studies, situated on Ethel Street, Saint James, Trinidad and Tobago. At night the same buildings function as the Polytechnic Institute, a night school for adult education.

Noted Sixth Form Government alumni
 Dr. Deo Singh, ophthalmologist
 Senator Jennifer Jones Kernahan
 Dr. Bridgette Budhlall, professor

See also 
 List of schools in Trinidad and Tobago

External links 
 www.sixthformpoly.com - School's Official Website 
 Alumni's Mailing list the Poly-Tech Mailing list for Alumni

Schools in Trinidad and Tobago 
Secondary schools in Trinidad and Tobago 
Buildings and structures in Port of Spain